Avirak (also Romanized as Avīrak) is a village in Rudbar-e Mohammad-e Zamani Rural District, Alamut-e Gharbi District, Qazvin County, Qazvin Province, Iran. At the 2006 census, its population was 292, living in 95 families.

References 

Populated places in Qazvin County